Central Catholic High School is a private, Roman Catholic, Lasallian, all-boys college preparatory school in Pittsburgh, Pennsylvania, United States. It is a part of the Diocese of Pittsburgh. The De La Salle Brothers administer and partially staff the school.

History

In the 1920s, Bishop Hugh Charles Boyle of the Diocese of Pittsburgh started a program to expand diocesan involvement in education beyond the existing parish schools founded by the predominantly Catholic immigrant population of the city. Boyle invited the Brothers of the Christian Schools (more commonly known as the Christian Brothers) to found an all-male secondary school in Oakland, the academic district of Pittsburgh. The first freshmen class entered in 1927, and Central Catholic's success allowed Boyle to expand on the diocesan network of boys' schools with North Catholic, Serra Catholic, and South Hills Catholic High School.

Although the school initially took students only from the central neighborhoods of Pittsburgh, the decline of regional equivalents such as North Catholic and South Catholic, following both schools' gradual switch to coeducation, eventually attracted students from a more comprehensive geographic and socioeconomic range. Students attend from neighborhoods including Bloomfield and Squirrel Hill, to suburban communities such as Cranberry, Jefferson Hills, and Fox Chapel. The diocese also opened a sister school, Oakland Catholic, in the Oakland area.

Curriculum
Central Catholic's academic courses are divided into five levels:
 Regular (Level 1; 4.0 scale),
 Intermediate (Level 2; 4.4 scale),
 Advanced (Level 3; 4.8 scale),
 Honors (Level 4; 5.4 scale),
 Advanced Placement (Level 5; 6.0 scale).
Class rank is based upon GPA weighted for level. Because the different academic levels are weighted differently, the weighted GPA is based upon a 6.0 rather than 5.0 scale. Freshmen are placed into course levels within the various departments based on elementary school grades and a standardized placement test given by the school itself. The foreign languages offered are French, Latin, Spanish, and Italian. Freshmen may choose to take an elective course in music or art departments. All freshmen are required to take 1 semester of Gym (Level 1) and 21st Century Technology (Level 3).

Upperclassmen have more flexibility in course and department selection. The school offers 16 Advanced Placement courses and over 30 honors courses.

The Baginski Scholars Program is a progressive, interdisciplinary program designed to let students who excel academically participate in activities and discussions to build their knowledge in social sciences, humanities, and the sciences. The program is directed by John Allen and Patrizia Costa.

In the 2013–2014 school year, two pilot engineering classes were introduced, and the school planned to construct a new building for STEM subjects. During the same year, a one to one computing program was initiated at the high school. iPads were deployed to all freshmen and sophomores.

Extracurricular activities

The school has an athletic history that includes championships for track and field, soccer, swimming, rowing, bowling and football. Other varsity sports offered are basketball, baseball, rugby, tennis, lacrosse, bowling, ice hockey, in-line hockey, golf, cross country, wrestling, and volleyball. Fencing, table tennis, Ultimate frisbee, and disc golf are offered as club sports.

The school has a forensics team, musical theater productions, referred to by the students as “Masque”, PJAS participation, student publications, a chess team, and a robotics team.

The school's mascot is the Viking. It had a long-standing rivalry with North Catholic High School until enrollment declined at North Catholic. Competition grew increasingly one-sided in favor of Central Catholic. North Allegheny, Pine-Richland and Woodland Hills have come to replace North Catholic as the school's significant rivals in sports, and Shady Side Academy in academics.

Athletics
In 2013, the Central Catholic Rowing Team won its first gold medal at SRAA nationals, defeating their rivals, St. Joseph's Prep. On July 23, 2013, a proclamation was made by the city of Pittsburgh declaring that day, July 23, 2013, Central Catholic Crew Day in honor of the win by the crew. The football team defeated Woodland Hills High School, defeating them 27–7 in the WPIAL Quad A championship.

In 2014, Central Catholic's second varsity (2V) crew won its first gold medal. In the last stretch of the race, Central Catholic's boat advanced a marginal length on Gonzaga College High School's 2V, leaving Winter Park High School in third place. Additionally, the first varsity (1V) and the first freshmen (1F) boats received bronze and silver medals, respectively.

In 2015, Central Catholic's undefeated club Ultimate Frisbee team won the Division II PHUL championships, defeating their rivals from Bethel Park. The varsity baseball team also won the 4A WPIAL Championship, defeating Norwin High School.

In 2016, Central Catholic's football team won the first-ever 6A WPIAL Championship. They lost the first-ever 6A PIAA Championship to St. Joseph's. List of PIAA football state champions The golf team won its second 3A WPIAL Championship with a WPIAL record score of 378. The team continued to the PIAA state championship. The team shot a PIAA record score of 297, winning their first state championship in golf. The golf team continued this success by winning the 2017 WPIAL championship.

In 2018, Central Catholic's varsity golf team won their third consecutive WPIAL title with another record-setting round of 372. They continued this success into the PIAA 3A state championship and again claimed first place.

Campus
Built in the 1920s in the National Romantic style, the school building is designated a Pittsburgh History and Landmarks Foundation Historic Landmark. The building has undergone renovations to the classrooms, the dining hall, the library, the theater, the writing center, and other areas. Renovation of the classrooms included adding flat screen televisions, Smart Boards, and other learning technology devices.

On the same campus as the main building, there is a gymnasium, an athletic field, a weight training room, and the STEM building. Next to the main building, on the Neville Street side, is the Brothers' House, where the Brothers of the Christian Schools who work at Central Catholic live.

The school held a groundbreaking ceremony on December 3, 2014, for the new building for STEM subjects. The building opened at the beginning of the 2016-2017 school year for academic use.

Notable alumni

Athletes
 John Babinecz – football player drafted in the second round in 1972 by Dallas Cowboys
 Marc Bulger – NFL quarterback for Baltimore Ravens and St. Louis Rams
 Jeff Dugan – football player for Minnesota Vikings
 Tim Grgurich – basketball head coach, University of Pittsburgh and UNLV
 Vincenzo Joseph – two-time NCAA Wrestling Champion for Penn State
 Justin Kurpeikis – football player for four NFL teams
 Tony LaCava – baseball player and executive
 Dan Marino – Pro Football Hall of Fame quarterback, Miami Dolphins and television commentator
 Sam McDowell – known as "Sudden Sam," Major League Baseball pitcher, primarily Cleveland Indians, six-time American League All-Star
 George Patterson – basketball player
 Sal Sunseri – former All-American linebacker for University of Pittsburgh Panthers, assistant coach for  Florida State University Seminoles
 Jack Twyman – Naismith Basketball Hall of Fame guard/forward, Rochester/Cincinnati Royals
 Ed Vereb – former NFL football halfback for Washington Redskins
 Stefen Wisniewski – guard for Kansas City Chiefs
 Damar Hamlin (Class of 2016) – safety for the Buffalo Bills
 Rodney Thomas II - safety for the Indianapolis Colts
 Cal Adomitis - long snapper for the Cincinnati Bengals
 Michael Grady – Olympic rower at the 2020 Summer Olympics for the U.S. Men's coxless four
 Alex Miklasevich – Olympic rower at the 2020 Summer Olympics for the U.S. Men's eight

Business
 John F. "Jack" Donahue – founder and Chairman of Federated Investors, Inc.
 David Lucchino - co-founder and CEO of Frequency Therapeutics, a biotechnology company
  James Sinegal – co-founder and CEO of Costco

Entertainment
 Regis Cordic – radio personality
 Bill Deasy – singer/songwriter
 Frank DiLeo – music executive and actor
 Tom Savini – special effect and makeup expert
 Zachary Quinto – Emmy nominated actor and director
 Liam Bonner – baritone opera singer

Journalism/publication
 John Tierney – science columnist for The New York Times
 Robert Lee "Rob" Penny – playwright and poet
 Bill Hillgrove – sports journalist, radio personality, broadcaster.
 Joseph Bathanti – Poet Laureate of North Carolina, author, professor 
 August Wilson – playwright (dropped out after one year)

Government / military
 Martell Covington – Pennsylvania State Representative
 William Coyne – US congressman
 Rich Fitzgerald – Allegheny County Executive
 Thomas E. Flaherty – Judge, Allegheny County Court of Common Pleas
 Conor Lamb, former assistant U.S. attorney, Marine, and U.S. Representative for Pennsylvania's 17th district
 Lewis C. Merletti – director of the United States Secret Service
 Thomas M. Nolan – Pennsylvania State Representative and State Senator
 Corey O'Connor – Councilman, Pittsburgh City Council
 Ralph Pampena – Pittsburgh Police Chief 1987–1990
 Stephen Zappala Sr. – Pennsylvania Supreme Court Chief Justice
 Stephen Zappala – Allegheny County District Attorney

Education
 Henry J. McAnulty – President of Duquesne University (1959–1980)
 L. Timothy Ryan – President of The Culinary Institute of America
 G. Marcus Cole – Is the Joseph A. Matson Dean and Professor of Law at the Notre Dame Law School.
 Timothy M. Devinney – Professor, Alliance Manchester Business School.
 Michael New –  is a Visiting Assistant Professor at the Busch School of Business at The Catholic University of America.

Notes

External links
Central Catholic High School homepage
Roman Catholic Diocese of Pittsburgh homepage
Student Body Page
Arts Page
Central Catholic Crew homepage

Boys' schools in Pennsylvania
Educational institutions established in 1927
High schools in Pittsburgh
Catholic secondary schools in Pennsylvania
Lasallian schools in the United States
Pittsburgh History & Landmarks Foundation Historic Landmarks
1927 establishments in Pennsylvania
National Romantic architecture in the United States
Art Nouveau architecture in Pennsylvania
Art Nouveau educational buildings